Odd Mom Out is an American comedy television series that premiered on June 8, 2015, on Bravo. Based on the novel Momzillas, Odd Mom Out was created by and stars Jill Kargman as a fictionalized version of herself named Jill Weber, who is forced to navigate the wealthy mommy clique that resides in New York’s prestigious Upper East Side neighborhood. Andy Buckley, KK Glick, Sean Kleier, Joanna Cassidy, and Abby Elliott also co-star in the series.

On September 22, 2016, the network renewed Odd Mom Out for a 10-episode third season shortly after the second season concluded.

, a total of 30 episodes of Odd Mom Out have aired.

Series overview

Episodes

Season 1 (2015)

Season 2 (2016)

Notes

Season 3 (2017)

References

External links
 
 
 

Lists of American sitcom episodes